Firenze Rifredi railway station, or Florence Rifredi railway station, serves the city and comune of Florence, in the region of Tuscany, central Italy.  It is the third most important railway station in Florence, after Firenze Santa Maria Novella and Firenze Campo di Marte.  It also forms part of the traditional Bologna–Florence railway, and the railways linking Florence with Viareggio, and Pisa and Livorno, respectively.

The station is currently managed by Rete Ferroviaria Italiana (RFI).  Train services to and from the station are operated by Trenitalia.  Each of these companies is a subsidiary of Ferrovie dello Stato (FS), Italy's state-owned rail company.

Location
Firenze Rifredi railway station is situated in Via dello Steccuto, in the district of Rifredi in the north of the city.

Features
The station features nine through tracks used for passenger trains.  These are served by five platforms partly covered by canopies.  The platforms are connected with each other by a pedestrian underpass.

Passenger and train movements

The station is served by regional trains direct to Prato, Bologna, Pisa, Livorno, Pistoia, Lucca, Viareggio, Carrara, La Spezia, Siena, Campiglia Marittima and Grosseto.

For many InterCity trains, both northbound and southbound, Firenze Rifredi is the only station in the city of Florence at which the train stops, to avoid reversing at SMN.

While from 1989, when service of high speed pendolino train began, the stop for that trains were in Rifredi station, gradually more of such trains were moved to   
Firenze Santa Maria Novella, or Firenze Campo Marte, until 2005 when no more HS train stopped regularly at this station.

Interchange
The station has a bus terminal for urban buses.

See also

History of rail transport in Italy
List of railway stations in Tuscany
Rail transport in Italy
Railway stations in Italy

References

External links

Description and pictures of Firenze Rifredi railway station 

This article is based upon a translation of the Italian language version as at February 2011.

Rifredi Railway Station